Derik or Daryek in Iran may refer to:
 Daryek, Mazandaran
 Derik, West Azerbaijan